Jörg Armin Jaksche (born 23 July 1976 in Fürth) is a German former road bicycle racer. In 2007 Jaksche admitted he was guilty of blood doping.

Biography
Jaksche has been cycling professionally since 1997, racing for the teams Polti (1997–1998), Team Telekom (1998–2000), ONCE (2001–2003), CSC (2004), Liberty Seguros–Würth/Astana (2005–2006) and Tinkoff Credit Systems in 2007.

In 2004, he won the Tour Mediterranean and the Paris–Nice race.

In the 2005 Tour de France, Jaksche finished 16th overall, the best result of his six participations in the Tour. He had been 18th at the 1998 Tour de France and 17th at the 2003 Tour de France.

At the 2006 Tour de Suisse, Jaksche finished on the podium with a third-place finish.

Jaksche is now living in Sydney, Australia studying a Master of International Business at the University of New South Wales.

Doping
Jaksche was one of the nine riders held out of the 2006 Tour de France after being identified by investigators in the Operación Puerto investigation.  On 30 June 2007 Jaksche admitted he was guilty of blood doping and that he was the Bella mentioned in the documents confiscated from Fuentes' clinic.

Major results

1993
 2nd Junior road race, National Road Championships
1994
 1st  Junior road race, National Road Championships
 3rd Overall Driedaagse van Axel
1996
 1st Stage 1 Rapport Toer
 2nd Overall Sachsen-Tour
1997
 1st  World Military Road race Championships
 3rd World Military Time trial Championships
1998
 3rd Road race, National Road Championships
1999
 10th Züri-Metzgete
2000
 4th Overall Volta a Catalunya
 10th Overall Critérium International
2001
 1st Stage 1 Volta a Catalunya (TTT)
 3rd La Flèche Wallonne
 8th Overall Paris–Nice
 9th Gran Premio Miguel Induráin
 10th Giro del Piemonte
2002
 1st Stage 4 Tour de France (TTT)
 1st Stage 1 Vuelta a España (TTT)
 6th Overall Deutschland Tour
 6th Overall Grand Prix du Midi Libre
 7th Gran Premio Miguel Induráin
 7th Overall Vuelta a la Comunidad Valenciana
 10th Overall Tirreno–Adriatico
2003
 1st Stage 1 Vuelta a España (TTT)
 4th Overall Paris–Nice
 4th Overall Deutschland Tour
2004
 1st Overall Paris–Nice
1st Stage 1
 1st Overall Tour Méditerranéen
1st Stage 5
 3rd Overall Tour de Luxembourg
2005
 3rd Overall Critérium International
 4th Overall Deutschland Tour
 5th Overall Paris–Nice
2006
 2nd Overall Tirreno–Adriatico
 3rd Overall Tour de Suisse
 4th Overall Tour de Romandie
2007
 1st Overall Circuit de Lorraine
1st Stage 5
 2nd Overall Euskal Bizikleta

See also
 List of doping cases in cycling
List of sportspeople sanctioned for doping offences

References

External links
Official Site
Jörg Jaksche in the current BDR ranking list
Cyclingnews.com coverage of the interview with Der Spiegel, during which he confesses

1976 births
Living people
German male cyclists
Sportspeople from Fürth
Doping cases in cycling
German sportspeople in doping cases
Cyclists from Bavaria